De Soto station is a station on the G Line of the Los Angeles Metro Busway system. The station is next to Victory Boulevard, which parallels that section of the Orange Line. It is located in the western San Fernando Valley near the meeting of three largely residential municipal communities of the City of Los Angeles: Canoga Park, Winnetka, and Woodland Hills.

It is named after the adjacent De Soto Avenue, which travels north-south and crosses the east-west busway route. Counting from the western terminus in Chatsworth, it is the sixth station on the Orange Line.

Service

Station Layout

Hours and frequency

Connections 
, the following connections are available:
 City of Santa Clarita Transit: 796
 Los Angeles Metro Bus: ,

References

External links 

G Line (Los Angeles Metro)
Los Angeles Metro Busway stations
Canoga Park, Los Angeles
Winnetka, Los Angeles
Woodland Hills, Los Angeles
Public transportation in the San Fernando Valley
Public transportation in Los Angeles
Bus stations in Los Angeles
2005 establishments in California